Salemai or Salimai ( 1940s) was an Afghan rebel king who ruled only in the Eastern Province.

Background 

In either 1944 or 1945, the Safi tribe rose up against the government of the Kingdom of Afghanistan. According to British records, the uprising was caused by the Afghan government's attempts to institute conscription among the Safi, trading monopolies granted to Afghan merchant companies, and government surveillance. Whit Mason attributes the Safi uprising to "extremely brutal taxation, oppression and poverty".

King 
Religious scholars among the Safi ruled that anyone who rebelled against their King and died should be excluded from being counted as martyrs. Therefore, they were required to select one of their own as king. According to Whit Mason's version of events in The Rule of Law in Afghanistan (2011), in either 1944 or 1945, the Safi selected Shahswar as king, Salemai as prime minister and Amanul Mulk as minister of defence. However, Mason appears to mix up several roles. David B. Edwards, a veteran scholar of Afghan history, gives the following quote from Amanul Mulk (whom Edwards interviewed personally) in Caravan of Martyrs (2017), which appears to confirm that Salemai was King and not Prime Minister:

By the end of October 1945, most of the Safis, except for a few die-hards had come to terms with the Afghan government. This peace agreement included among other things the abandonment or postponement of Safi conscription.

On 23 November 1946, Mohammed Daoud Khan gave the remaining Safi peace terms, which included the return of rifles and small arms ammunition captured from government troops, the surrender of Shahswar, Said Muhd, Salim Khan and Allah Khan, the sale of grain to the government at reasonable rates, and the despatch of Safi youths to Kabul for education. It is unclear if the Safi accepted these terms, but all sources agree that the Safi uprising had subsided by the end of 1946.

Later life 
In 1947, Salemai had a reunion in Shulgara with Shahswar and Amanul Mulk. Afterwards, Salemai fades out of the historical record.

References 

Year of birth missing
Year of death missing
20th-century Afghan monarchs
20th-century Afghan politicians
Kings of Afghanistan
1940s in Afghanistan
Afghan rebels